Nesiotus is a genus of beetles belonging to the family Phalacridae.

Species:

Nesiotus olibroides 
Nesiotus similis

References

Phalacridae